Połaniec Power Station is a coal-fired and biomass power station near Połaniec in Świętokrzyskie Voivodeship, Poland. It consists of 8 units each with a generation capacity of 225 MW. The power station went into service between 1979 and 1983. Originally these units had a generation capacity of 200 MW, but after turbine modernization between 1992 and 1995, it grew up to its actual value.

Following a 1 billion PLN (290 million USD) investment, in November 2012 a biomass power plant became operational at the site of the existing power station. The resulting biomass unit is one of the largest biomass power plants in the world.

Features
An interesting feature of the facility is that the outgoing powerlines cross the building of the power station on rooftop
pylons.

The biomass section is 80% fuelled by wood chips and 20% by agricultural waste. Wood chips are produced from wood waste at the fuel yard, while the agricultural wastes are supplied from within 100km radius of the plant.

From the eight 225MWe turbines, the biomass unit produces 205MW.

See also 
 Bełchatów Power Station
 Katowice Power Station 
 Jaworzno Power Station 
 Kozienice Power Station 
 Łaziska Power Station 
 List of tallest structures in Poland
 List of power stations in Poland

References

 Elektrownia Połaniec GDF SUEZ
 GDF SUEZ

Coal-fired power stations in Poland
Staszów County
Buildings and structures in Świętokrzyskie Voivodeship